Parapsestis argenteopicta is a moth in the family Drepanidae. It was described by Oberthür in 1879. It is found in the Russian Far East, Korea, Japan, Taiwan, western, north-eastern, northern and central China and Nepal. The habitat consists of various types of mixed forests and oak woods.

The wingspan is 39–47 mm.

The larvae feed on Quercus mongolica.

Subspecies
Parapsestis argenteopicta argenteopicta (Russian Far East, Japan, Korea, China: Jilin, Henan, Shaanxi, Gansu, Zhejiang, Hubei, Jiangxi, Hunan, Sichuan, Yunnan)
Parapsestis argenteopicta annamica Laszlo, G.Ronkay, L.Ronkay & Witt, 2007 (Nepal)
Parapsestis argenteopicta nepalina Laszlo, G.Ronkay, L.Ronkay & Witt, 2007 (Nepal)
Parapsestis argenteopicta taiwana (Wileman, 1911) (Taiwan)

References

Moths described in 1879
Thyatirinae
Moths of Asia